Što te tata pušta samu (trans. Why Does Your Daddy Let You Go Alone) is the fourth studio album by Serbian and former Yugoslav hard rock band Griva, released in 1988.

Track listing
All songs written by Zlatko Karavla, except where noted.
"Što te tata pušta samu" - 2:44
"Ti u Sarajevu, ja u Novom Sadu" - 2:42
"Il' me ljubi il' me ubi" - 3:30
"Ostani još malo" - 3:13
"Ja još imam snage" (Alen Islamović) - 4:35
"Nađi sebi drugu ludu" - 2:56
"Nekad sam mogao tri put na dan" - 3:37
"Ranjavaš me, čergašice" (Alen Islamović) - 3:22
"Lake žene i loše vino" - 2:54
"Nije mi ništa, samo malo strepim" - 3:19
"Moja sele" (Alen Islamović) - 3:24

Personnel 
Zlatko Karavla - vocals
Zoran Maletić - guitar, backing vocals
Vojislav Vilić - guitar
Momčilo Bajac - bass guitar, acoustic guitar, backing vocals
Predrag Janičić - drums

Additional personnel 
Saša Lokner - keyboards
Rex Ilusivii - Emulator II
Ivan Fece - drums (on "Nije mi ništa, samo malo strepim")
Josip Sabo - backing vocals
Voja Ušar - backing vocals

References 
Što te tata pušta samu at Discogs
 EX YU ROCK enciklopedija 1960-2006,  Janjatović Petar;

External links 
Što te tata pušta samu at Discogs

Griva albums
1988 albums
PGP-RTB albums